We Still Hold These Truths is the title of  a 2009 non-fiction political history book by Matthew Spalding.   Spalding was Director of American Studies at The Heritage Foundation. He later became the Kirby Professor in Constitutional Government at Hillsdale College and the Dean of the Van Andel Graduate School of Government at Hillsdale College's Washington, D.C., campus. As Vice President for Washington Operations, he also oversees the Allan P. Kirby, Jr. Center for Constitutional Studies and Citizenship and the academic and educational programs of Hillsdale in the nation's capital.

In November 2009, the Spalding book reached number two on the Washington Post non-fiction bestseller list.

Overview
Spalding's focus in the book is the United States' "first principles", his belief that those principles have been betrayed by the American Left, and his plan for how conservatives can work to restore the vision of the Founding Fathers. Spalding takes the reader through the earliest days of American history to the present, demonstrating these principles were understood by the Founders and shaped the U.S. national identity.

According to Spalding, the erosion of these principles began with the Progressives of the late 19th and early 20th centuries, who believed in centralization, bureaucracy, relativism and a lack of absolute truths, and who, Spalding writes, sought to undermine the vision of the U.S. Constitution's framers. Spalding calls today's liberals "pimps for the new progressivism," inspired by New Dealers and proponents of the Great Society. Spalding also writes that recent Republican electoral victories and the successes of the Tea Party demonstrate that Americans still believe in the vision outlined by the Founding Fathers, and that a debate over the Constitution has been given new life everywhere from law schools to the federal government.

The book's foreword is written by conservative commentator William Bennett, who writes that We Still Hold These Truths "makes a clear and compelling case for America's principles as an enduring source of real, practical guidance for today explaining how we got so far off track, and laying out how to get our nation back on course."

Reception
The book received positive reviews from conservative-leaning reviewers, including The Weekly Standard, National Review and The Washington Times, and reached No. 2 on the Washington Posts non-fiction bestseller list. According to columnist Cal Thomas, Spalding's book offers a "long-range strategy" for conservatives "if they want to save the country from the long-term consequences of what many call 'socialism.'"

References

External links
Matthew Spalding—Heritage Foundation biography

2009 non-fiction books
Political books
Books critical of modern liberalism in the United States
American political books